The Xiaomi Mi 10 Ultra is an Android-based high-end smartphone developed by Xiaomi Inc. announced on 11 August 2020 as a celebration of Xiaomi's 10th anniversary. Unlike the Mi 10 and Mi 10 Pro, Mi 10 Ultra is only available on the Chinese market.

Specifications

Design 
The Mi 10 Ultra uses an aluminum frame, Gorilla Glass 5 on the front and Gorilla Glass 6 on the back. The display is curved and larger than the Mi 9 Pro; a circular cutout in the upper left hand corner for the front-facing camera replaces the Mi 9 Pro's notch. The camera module is rectangular and protrudes slightly, with a lower module housing three sensors and the flash, and an upper module for the periscope telephoto sensor with a silver accent. It is available in Obsidian Black, Mercury Silver, and a special Transparent Edition.

Hardware 
The Mi 10 Ultra is powered by the Qualcomm Snapdragon 865 processor, with the Adreno 650 GPU. Storage is non-expandable with 128, 256 or 512 GB of UFS 3.1 paired with 8, 12 or 16 GB of LPDDR5 RAM.

It has an 6.67-inch (169 mm) FHD+ OLED display manufactured by TCL with HDR10+ support, and an optical (in-screen) fingerprint scanner. However, the panel has a higher 120 Hz refresh rate compared to 90 Hz on the Mi 10 and Mi 10 Pro, and can display one billion colors. The battery is graphene-based lithium-ion with a 4500mAh capacity; charging is supported wired over USB-C at up to 120 W or wirelessly at up to 50 W (Qi), with 10 W reverse charging.

The rear features a quad camera setup, with a 48 MP wide sensor, a 48 MP 5x zoom "periscope" telephoto sensor, a 12 MP 2x zoom telephoto sensor, and a 20 MP ultrawide sensor. The front-facing camera uses a 20 MP sensor. The camera system, including processing, scored the highest results in the history of DxOMark testing and review, for both still photography and videography.

Software 
The Mi 10 Ultra runs on Android 10, with Xiaomi's custom MIUI 12 skin.

References 

Android (operating system) devices
Phablets
Mobile phones introduced in 2020
Mobile phones with multiple rear cameras
Mobile phones with 8K video recording
Mobile phones with infrared transmitter
Discontinued flagship smartphones
Xiaomi smartphones